Michael Denis Gale FRS (25 August 1943 - 18 July 2009) was a British plant geneticist.

He studied at West Buckland School, Birmingham University, and Aberystwyth University with Hubert Rees. He worked at the Plant Breeding Institute, Cambridge, and the John Innes Centre, Norwich Research Park. He was elected Fellow of the Royal Society in 1996.

Awards and honours
 1994 − gold medal from the Royal Horticultural Society
 1998 − The Royal Society Darwin Medal, jointly with Professor Graham Moore

Works
Michael D. Gale and Katrien M. Devos, "Comparative genetics in the grasses", Proc Natl Acad Sci. 1998 March 3; 95(5): 1971–1974

References

1943 births
2009 deaths
People educated at West Buckland School
Alumni of the University of Birmingham
Alumni of Aberystwyth University
Academics of the University of East Anglia
Fellows of the Royal Society
British geneticists
Foreign members of the Chinese Academy of Engineering